Grand Prairie Independent School District is a school district headquartered in Grand Prairie, Texas, United States.

GPISD is a  district serving more than 29,339 students within the Dallas County portion of Grand Prairie. The district boasts 41 campuses, including two early education schools, 22 elementary schools, six middle schools, three 6-12 campuses, three high schools, two early college high schools, two alternative education schools, and one charter school partnership. The District employs more than 4,525 staff members and offers a variety of services and programs designed to help students radiate success.

To attend a GPISD school, kindergarten children must be five years old on or before September 1 of the current school year. Special early childhood programs are available for children ages 3–5 who are handicapped or developmentally delayed, and for infants from birth to age two who are blind or deaf.

GPISD is an open enrollment district through the Schools and Programs of Choice. Students entering GPISD from other accredited schools are admitted at the level authorized by individual transcripts. A student enrolling in Grand Prairie schools must be a resident of the GPISD and must provide satisfactory proof of residency and required immunizations.

The high schools in the district are Grand Prairie High School, South Grand Prairie High School and Dubiski Career High School.

The GPISD Education Center is located at 2602 South Belt Line Road.

In 2011, the school district was rated "academically acceptable" by the Texas Education Agency.

Schools

High schools

Grades 9-12
Grand Prairie High School
South Grand Prairie High School
Dubiski Career High School
Grades 6-12
Young Women's Leadership Academy at Arnold
Grand Prairie Collegiate Institute
Grand Prairie Fine Arts Academy

Middle schools
Grades 6-8
Digital Arts & Technology Academy at Adams Middle School
Fannin Middle School
Jackson Middle School
Reagan Middle School
Truman Middle School
Young Men's Leadership Academy at Kennedy Middle School

Elementary schools
Grades K-5
Austin Environmental Science Academy
Bowie Fine Arts Academy
Global Leadership Academy at Barbara Bush Elementary
Daniels Elementary Academy of Science and Math
De Zavala Environmental Science Academy
Dickinson Elementary School
Eisenhower Elementary School
Florence Hill Elementary School
Garcia Elementary School
Garner Fine Arts Academy
Marshall Leadership Academy
Ochoa STEM Academy at Milam Elementary
Moore College & Career Preparatory
Morton Elementary School
Moseley Elementary School
Powell Elementary
Rayburn Elementary STEAM Academy
School for the Highly Gifted
Seguin Elementary School
Travis World Language Academy
Whitt Fine Arts Academy
Uplift Lee Preparatory

Early Education Centers
Pre-K & Kindergarten
Bonham Early Education School
Crockett Early Education School

Alternative Schools
Johnson Alternative Education Program (Grades 6-12)
Crosswinds High School (Grades 9-12)

Demographics

In 1997, 42.5% of the students were non-Hispanic white. Eric Nicholson of the Dallas Observer stated that white flight was already occurring by then. In 2000 46% of the students were Hispanic or Latino, and this increased to 57% by 2005. By 2016, 12% of the students were non-Hispanic white, and Nicholson concluded that "change happened rapidly.".

In 1997, 45.1% of the students were low income - Nicholson stated that an increase in poor students was already occurring by then-but this increased to 72% in 2016.

Racism in the John A. Dibiski Career High School

CBS Texas has substantiated claims of racism in the Grand Prairie School District by releasing a video of students in a classroom activity that included making banners that read "Hate N------ 4 life!" while students repeatedly used the ethnic slur in the classroom while the video was recorded.

References

External links

 Grand Prairie Independent School District

School districts in Dallas County, Texas
Grand Prairie, Texas